Collection is a 2017 album by American indie rock singer-songwriter Soccer Mommy made up of retooled versions of her bedroom pop recordings originally posted on Bandcamp. The release was preceded by a music video for "Allison".

Critical reception
 Writing for Pitchfork Media, Evan Rytlewski gave the album a 6.7 out of 10, praising the artist's elaboration of her bedroom pop recordings but criticizing repetitive songwriting and a lack of experience at recording. Marissa Lorusso of NPR's Songs We Love chose "Out Worn" to spotlight, praising Soccer Mommy's growth as a songwriter. Hana Kaplan of Paste gave it a 7.9 out of 10, summing up that it's a "refreshing look at your past, a tender look at the moments that made you, you".

Track listing
All songs written by Sophie Allison

Side A
"Allison" – 2:39
"Try" – 2:59
"Death by Chocolate" – 4:12
"Out Worn" – 4:35

Side B
"3 AM at a Party" – 2:33
"Inside Out" – 4:56
"Benadryl Dreams" – 4:02
"Waiting for Cars" – 3:56

Personnel
Credits are adapted from the Collection liner notes.

Soccer Mommy – guitar, vocals
Emily Allison – artwork
Thomas Borrelli – drums, backing vocals
Harry James Clifford – interior photos
Jacob Corenflos – bass guitar
Justin Fargiano – cover photo
Clay Jones – mastering
Casey Weissbuch – synthesizer on "Waiting for Cars"
Kelton Young – lead guitar

References

External links

2017 compilation albums
Soccer Mommy albums
Fat Possum Records albums